is a Japanese voice actor represented by Aoni Production. He is a graduate of Hosei University.

Filmography

Television animation
1966
Sally the Witch (Mephisto, Dump Driver, Charlatan)

1968
Akane-chan (Uncle Kusuke)
GeGeGe no Kitarou 1st Series (Konaki Jijii (ep. 7 only), Akamata)

1969
Tiger Mask (Michiaki Yoshimura, Master Arashi, Lionman, Red Mask of Death, others)
Attack No.1 (Headmaster)
Mōretsu Atarō (Kumagorō Omawari-san)

1971
GeGeGe no Kitarou 2nd Series (Miage Nyuudou)
Lupin III 1st Series (Lupin II)

1972
Umi no Triton (Poseidon, Narrator)
The One Who Loves Justice: Moonlight Mask (Satan's Claw)
Mazinger Z (Dr. Nossori)
Mahōtsukai Chappy

1973
Doraemon (NTV anime)
Dororon Enma-kun (Principal Teacher, Yano's Father, others)
Babel II (Yumiko's Father)
Little Wansa (Rolf)

1975
Ikkyū-san

1977
Lupin III 2nd Series

1981
Little Women (Laurence)

1983
Kinnikuman (Chairman Harabote Muscle, The Mountain, Akuma Shogun/Gold Mask, Big the Budou, Canadianman, Oilman)

1990
Magical Tarurūto-kun (Harako Butler)

1991
Goldfish Warning! (Chairman)

1996
GeGeGe no Kitarou 4th Series (Miage Nyuudou, Masumoto, Ojii-san)

1998
Kare Kano (Hiroyuki's Grandfather)

1999
Pocket Monsters (Shimajio)
Bomberman B-Daman Bakugaiden V (Senninbon)

2002
Azumanga Daioh (Dr. Ishihara)
GetBackers (Visconti)

2011
Bunny Drop (Makio)

2014
Mushihi (Grandfather of the Medicine Bag)

OVA
1989
Legend of the Galactic Heroes (Al Salem)

Tokusatsu
Moonlight Mask (Nishikawa/Skeleton Mask)
Robot Detective (Locker man, Torpedo man)

Dubbing
Bullitt (1977 TV Asahi edition) (Weissberg (Robert Duvall))
Sabrina (Thomas Fairchild (John Wood))

References

External links
 Yonehiko Kitagawa at GamePlaza-Haruka Voice Acting Database 
 Yonehiko Kitagawa at Hitoshi Doi's Seiyuu Database

1931 births
Hosei University alumni
Japanese male voice actors
Male voice actors from Tokyo
Living people
20th-century Japanese male actors
21st-century Japanese male actors
Aoni Production voice actors